American actress Anne Hathaway has won 40 awards from 101 nominations. Her career began with a leading role in the television series Get Real (1999–2000), which garnered her a Teen Choice Award nomination for Choice TV Actress. Her film debut came with the leading role of Mia Thermopolis in the Disney comedy The Princess Diaries (2001), for which she was nominated for an MTV Movie Award for Best Breakthrough Performance. Following a series of family films that were box-office failures, she made a transition to adult roles with the 2005 dramas Havoc and Brokeback Mountain, the latter of which was nominated for a Screen Actors Guild Award for Outstanding Performance by a Cast in a Motion Picture. The following year, Hathaway gained nominations for a Teen Choice Award and a British Independent Film Award for the comedy-drama The Devil Wears Prada and the biopic Becoming Jane, respectively.

In 2008, Hathaway played a recovering drug addict in Rachel Getting Married, for which she received nominations for an Academy Award and a Golden Globe Award for Best Actress. She was nominated for a Drama Desk Award for Outstanding Actress in a Play for starring in The Public Theater's 2009 production of Twelfth Night. Her leading roles in the romances Bride Wars (2009) and Love & Other Drugs (2010) garnered her nominations for two MTV Movie & TV Awards and a Golden Globe, respectively. In 2010, she won a Primetime Emmy Award for Outstanding Voice-Over Performance for providing her voice for an episode on The Simpsons. Hathaway had her biggest commercial success with the role of Catwoman in Christopher Nolan's superhero film The Dark Knight Rises (2012), for which she won a Saturn Award for Best Supporting Actress. For playing Fantine, a prostitute dying of tuberculosis, in Les Misérables (2012), she won several awards, including an Academy Award, a Golden Globe and a BAFTA Award for Best Supporting Actress.

Hathaway played a NASA scientist in the science fiction film Interstellar (2014), for which she was nominated for a Saturn Award for Best Actress. For her work in the play Grounded (2015), she was nominated for a Drama League Award. Hathaway then starred in the commercially successful comedies The Intern (2015) and Ocean's 8 (2018), for both of which she earned nominations for People's Choice Awards. In 2019, Hathaway received a star on the Hollywood Walk of Fame for her contributions to the motion picture industry. That year, for the role of a woman with bipolar disorder in an episode of the anthology series Modern Love, Hathaway earned a Critics' Choice Television Award nomination. Her role in the film The Witches (2020) earned her nominations for a Nickelodeon Kids' Choice Award for Favorite Movie Actress and a Golden Raspberry Award for Worst Actress.

Awards and nominations

Notes

References 

Hathaway, Anne